The Mitchell Hawks are a Junior ice hockey team based in Mitchell, Ontario, Canada.  They play in the Provincial Junior Hockey League of the Ontario Hockey Association.

History
The Mitchell Hawks were founded in 1966 in one of the many Ontario Hockey Association Junior C leagues.  They finished low in the standings and were allowed to compete in the Junior D provincial championships.  In the Junior D play downs, the Hawks found their niche and made it all the way to the OHA Cup final against a representative from Madoc, Ontario.  The Hawks came up short and lost the series 4-games-to-1.

The following season, the same scenario played out in the Western Junior C league and the Hawks were entered into the Junior D playoffs.  The Hawks again made it to the final and defeated a representative from Bobcaygeon, Ontario, 4-games-to-none with one tie to win their first provincial championship in only their second season.  After the playoffs concluded, the Hawks dropped down to the Western Ontario Junior D Hockey League.

In 1974, the Hawks won the Western Junior D championship and challenged deep into the OHA championships.  Upon reaching the OHA Cup final, they met the South-Central Junior D Hockey League champion Bradford Vasey Juniors.  The Vasey Juniors defeated the Hawks 4-games-to-1 to win the provincial championship.

The Hawks fell on hard times in the 1980s and were forced to sit out the 1983–84 season.  In 1988, all of Ontario's Junior D was consolidated into one "super league" and in 1991 the league was renamed the OHA Junior Development League.

In 1993, the Hawks came back to prominence and made it all the way to the league final.  In the final, the Hawks challenged the Thamesford Trojans and defeated them by 4-games-to-1 to win their second OHA Cup.

The next season, the Hawks finished second overall in league standings with 35 wins and only 3 losses.  They battled through the playoffs and met the first place Port Stanley Lakers in the finals.  The Hawks defeated the Lakers 4-games-to-none to win their third OHA Cup and second straight OHAJDL championship.

The Mitchell Hawks finished the 2005–06 season first in their conference and fourth overall in the OHAJDL with 23 wins and 9 losses.  They entered the conference quarter-final against the eighth seeded West Lorne Lakers.  The Lakers created a massive upset and defeated the Hawks 4-games-to-2.  The upset helped clear the way for the seventh seeded Lucan Irish to eventually win the title.

In 2006, the OHAJDL disbanded and the Southern Ontario Junior Hockey League was formed.  The Hawks finished their first season in the SOJHL in fifth place overall with 26 wins and 12 losses.  In the first round of the playoffs, the Hawks drew the Central Elgin Express.  The Hawks defeated the Express 4-games-to-none.  In the second round, the Hawks came up against the Lambeth Lancers who they promptly swept 4-games-to-none as well.  In the conference final, the Hawks found themselves playing the Thamesford Trojans.  The Hawks ended up defeating the Trojans 4-games-to-2 to earn a birth to the SOJHL final.  Their opponents in the SOJHL final was the Delhi Travellers.  The Hawks ended up defeating the Travellers 4-games-to-2 to win their fourth ever OHA Cup and the first ever SOJHL championship.

On May 29, 2008, Mitchell was granted expansion into the Western Ontario Junior C Hockey League.  On September 19, the Hawks played their first modern Western Junior C game.  They were defeated on the road by the Kincardine Bulldogs 8–2.  The following night, the Hawks made their home debut and defeated the defending league champion Walkerton Hawks 3–1.

During the summer of 2016 the eight junior "C" leagues in Southern Ontario came together as the Provincial Junior Hockey League.  The former leagues became divisions and assigned to one of four conferences. For the Hawks it means they will play in the Western Conference and the Pollock Division.

Season-by-season standings

Playoffs
1967 Lost OHA final
Madoc Juniors defeated Mitchell Hawks 4-games-to-1 in OHA final
1968 Won OHA Championship
Mitchell Hawks defeated Bobcaygeon Juniors 4-games-to-none with one tie in OHA final
1974 Won League, Lost OHA final
Bradford Vasey Juniors defeated Mitchell Hawks 4-games-to-1 in OHA final
1993 Won League
Mitchell Hawks defeated Thamesford Trojans 4-games-to-1 in final
1994 Won League
Mitchell Hawks defeated Port Stanley Lakers 4-games-to-none in final
2006 Lost conference quarter-final
West Lorne Lakers defeated Mitchell Hawks 4-games-to-2 in conf. quarter-final
2007 Won League
Mitchell Hawks defeated Central Elgin Express 4-games-to-none in conf. quarter-final
Mitchell Hawks defeated Lambeth Lancers 4-games-to-none in conf. semi-final
Mitchell Hawks defeated Thamesford Trojans 4-games-to-2 in conf. final
Mitchell Hawks defeated Delhi Travellers 4-games-to-2 in final

References

External links
Mitchell Hawks' homepage

Ice hockey teams in Ontario